

Oswald John Louis Szemerényi, FBA (7 September 1913 in London – 29 December 1996 in Freiburg) was a Hungarian Indo-Europeanist with strong interests in comparative linguistics in general.

Biography 
He was educated in Hungary, at Eötvös Loránd University, and he studied at the universities of Heidelberg and Berlin. He was influenced by Hungarian linguist Gyula Laziczius. In 1942 he was appointed lecturer in Greek at Budapest University. In 1944 he habilitated with a thesis on Balto-Slavic unity, and in 1947 he was appointed professor of comparative Indo-European linguistics in Budapest. He returned to England in 1948, where he worked for Bedford College until 1960. He was professor of linguistics at Freiburg University from 1965 to 1981. He founded the Freiburg Linguistics Circle, influenced by the Budenz Circle, led by Josef Budenz, the founder of Finno-Ugric studies.

Selected bibliography
1960 Studies in the Indo-European System of Numerals, Heidelberg
1964 Syncope in Greek and Indo-European and the Nature of Indo-European Accent, Napoli
1970 Einführung in die vergleichende Sprachwissenschaft, Darmstadt
1989 3., vollständig neu bearbeitete Auflage
1996 Introduction to Indo-European Linguistics, Oxford
Richtungen der modernen Sprachwissenschaft
1971 Teil I: Von Saussure bis Bloomfield, 1916-1950, Heidelberg
1982 Teil II: Die fünfziger Jahre, 1950-1960, Heidelberg
1972 Comparative Linguistics (Current Trends of Linguistics)
1977 Studies in the Kinship Terminology of the Indo-European Languages, Leiden
1980 Four Old Iranian Ethnic Names: Scythian - Skudra - Sogdian - Saka, Vienna
Scripta Minora: selected essays in Indo-European, Greek, and Latin, edited by Patrick Considine and James T. Hooker, Innsbruck,
 1987 Vol. I: Indo-European
 1987 Vol. II: Latin
 1987 Vol. III: Greek
 1991 Vol. IV: Indo-European Languages other than Latin and Greek (1991)
1989 An den Quellen des lateinischen Wortschatzes, Innsbruck

See also
 Szemerényi's law

Sources
Prehistory, History, and Historiography of Language, Speech, and Linguistic Theory. (Papers in Honor of Oswald Szemerényi) (Amsterdam/Philadelphia 1992)
Historical Philology. Papers in Honor of Oswald Szemerényi II (Amsterdam/Philadelphia 1992)
Comparative-Historical Linguistics: Indo-European and Finno-Ugric. Papers in Honor of Oswald Szemerényi III (Amsterdam/Philadelphia 1993)

External links
 http://titus.uni-frankfurt.de/personal/galeria/szemeren.htm

Linguists from Hungary
Historical linguists
Linguists of Indo-European languages
1913 births
1996 deaths
20th-century linguists
Hungarian expatriates in Germany
Hungarian emigrants to the United Kingdom
Fellows of the British Academy
Indo-Europeanists